Nightbird is a 2-CD plus 1-DVD live album by American singer Eva Cassidy, released posthumously in November 2015, nineteen years after her death.
The album was recorded at the Blues Alley club in Washington, D.C. in January 1996. Some of the tracks had previously been released on the 1996 album, Live at Blues Alley. The recordings have been remixed and remastered from the original tapes. Of the 31 songs, 12 are previously unreleased, including the title track "Nightbird" (written by Doug MacLeod), as well as the jazz standards "It Don't Mean a Thing (If It Ain't Got That Swing)" and "Fever". Of the 12 unreleased tracks, eight are previously unheard songs. The DVD which accompanies the 2 audio CDs contains 12 songs from the same set, of which 9 were previously included on the 2004 DVD release Eva Cassidy Sings and the remaining 3 are released for the first time.

Critical reception
Matt Adams of The Herts Advertiser wrote: "An exceptional release, offering fresh insights into perhaps one of the greatest female vocalists of all time. Highly recommended."

Michael Bailey of All About Jazz said: "Nightbird reveals a modern song stylist not unlike Frank Sinatra. Cassidy's interpretative skills had few, if any, peers. She was equally at home with the Box Tops ("The Letter") and Bobby Troup ("Route 66"); Peggy Lee ("Fever") and Aretha Franklin ("Chain of Fools"). Her repertoire outside of the jazz standards and blues lay easily in the memory of anyone coming of age in the 1980s and '90s. Nightbird is a singular event to be savored and a talent too great to have experienced for such a short time."

Colin Morris of Stuff.co.nz said: "'Not without its flaws, there are some drop-outs, and I'm sure Cassidy would not approve of some tracks.  A tad strident, wrongly paced and boasting the occasional misreading of the composer's intentions, it is nevertheless a wonderful reminder of a talent lost too soon – her voice is simply remarkable and emotional."

Track listing
CD 1
 "Blue Skies" *
 "Ain't Doin' Too Bad"
 "Ain't No Sunshine"
 "Fields of Gold" *
 "Baby, I Love You"
 "Honeysuckle Rose" *
 "Route 66"
 "Bridge over Troubled Water" *
 (Eva introduces the band)
 "Chain of Fools"
 "Fever"
 "Autumn Leaves" *
 "Fine and Mellow" *
 "Cheek to Cheek" *
 "It Don't Mean a Thing (If It Ain't Got That Swing)"
 "Late in the Evening"
 "Next Time You See Me"
 "Waly Waly"

CD 2
 "Take Me to the River" *
 "Nightbird"
 "People Get Ready" *
 "The Letter"
 "Son of a Preacher Man"
 "Stormy Monday" *
 "Tall Trees in Georgia" *
 "Something's Got a Hold on Me"
 "Time After Time"
 "Over the Rainbow"
 "You're Welcome to the Club"
 "Caravan"
 "You've Changed"
 "What a Wonderful World" *
 "Oh, Had I a Golden Thread" *

–   * = previously available on "Live at Blues Alley"

DVD
 "Cheek to Cheek" **
 "Nightbird"
 "Honeysuckle Rose" **
 "Autumn Leaves" **
 "People Get Ready" **
 "Stormy Monday" **
 "Tall Trees in Georgia" **
 "Take Me to the River"
 "Bridge over Troubled Water"
 "Time After Time" **
 "Over the Rainbow" **
 "You've Changed" **

–  ** = previously available on "Eva Cassidy Sings" (DVD); "What A Wonderful World" from that collection is omitted here.

Personnel
Eva Cassidy – vocals, acoustic guitar, electric guitar
Chris Biondo – bass
Hilton Felton – Hammond organ
Keith Grimes – electric guitar
Raice McLeod – drums
Lenny Williams – piano

Chart positions

Weekly charts

Year-end charts

See also
 List of UK Independent Albums Chart number ones of 2015

Release history

References

External links
 "Nightbird" by Eva Cassidy at Discogs

Covers albums
Eva Cassidy albums
2015 live albums
Live albums published posthumously